Maximus (otherwise known as Maximus the Mad) is a supervillain appearing in American comic books published by Marvel Comics. The character has been depicted both as a member of and antagonist to the Inhumans. Created by writer Stan Lee and artist Jack Kirby, he first appeared in Fantastic Four #47 (February 1966).

Maximus was portrayed in 2017 Marvel Cinematic Universe (MCU) television series Inhumans by Iwan Rheon and Aidan Fiske.

Publication history

Maximus first appeared in Fantastic Four #47 (February 1966), and was created by Stan Lee and Jack Kirby.

Fictional character biography
Maximus, an Inhuman, was the second son of two of Attilan's top geneticists, Agon, the head of the ruling Council of Geneticists, and Rynda, director of the Prenatal Care Center. Subjected to the DNA-altering Terrigen Mist when he was an infant, Maximus peculiarly showed no outward sign of any mutagenic change. As he matured, he hid his developing psionic powers from the community, but was less successful at disguising his antisocial tendencies.

When he was about sixteen, his elder brother Black Bolt was released from the protective chamber in which he had been confined since birth due to the destructive nature of his Terrigen mutation. One of Maximus's first responses to his brother's freedom was an unsuccessful attempt to make him release his power and prove Black Bolt could not control his sonic powers, and thus lose his freedom. A month later, Black Bolt witnesses Maximus making a treacherous pact with an emissary of the Kree, the alien race responsible for genetically accelerating the Inhumans eons before. In an attempt to stop the fleeing emissary so that he could be questioned by the ruling council, Black Bolt uses his forbidden power of the quasi-sonic scream and blasts the alien ship out of the sky. When the ship crashes to Earth, it landed on the parliament building, killing several key members of the Genetics Council, including the boys' parents. The reverberations of Black Bolt's voice also affects Maximus, addling his sanity and suppressing his nascent mental powers. When Black Bolt assumes the throne shortly thereafter, Maximus vows to oppose his brother and eventually usurp his rule.

Maximus stages his first successful coup a few years later. By performing an illegal experiment on the Alpha Primitives, the subhuman worker clones that once served the Inhumans, Maximus creates the Trikon, three bodiless energy beings of great destructive power. While the Trikon wreaks havoc in Attilan, Maximus is able to drive the Royal Family of Inhumans out of the city. Maximus later sends Gorgon in search of the amnesiac Medusa. In the several year interval before Black Bolt and his cousins locate her in America, Maximus rules Attilan in Black Bolt's stead. Secure in his position, Maximus has his servant, the Seeker, locate the Royal Family and bring them back to Attilan. Upon doing so, Black Bolt seizes the crown back, to Maximus' dismay. Maximus also encounters the Fantastic Four for the first time. Maximus, hoping to win back the public's affection, activates the Atmo-Gun device he has been working on, a machine he believes will kill the human race and leave all other living beings intact. Maximus miscalculates, however, and the device has no effect. Out of spite, Maximus uses the device to erect a "negative zone" barrier (not to be confused with the anti-matter dimension of that name) that encases Attilan in a dark force sphere, imprisoning the entire race inside. Black Bolt liberates his people by using his quasi-sonic voice to destroy the barrier, at the price of devastating Attilan's ancient architecture.

Maximus then allies himself with six Inhuman criminals, sentenced for their treachery and subversive acts by Black Bolt with his verdict being interpreted by Oracle. Freeing Falcona, Aireo, Stallior, Nebulo, Leonus, and Timberius from their place of imprisonment with the Hulk's aid, Maximus then tricks the Hulk into breaching the protective barrier guarding a forbidden chemical substance created by the Inhuman scientist Romnar centuries ago. This substance had certain highly unstable energy absorbing capacities and Maximus intends to use it to usurp the throne again, but Black Bolt overpowers him before he can do so.

Maximus succeeds in bringing about his second coup some months later. Drugging the Royal Family with will-deadening "hypno-potions", Maximus takes the crown from Black Bolt and has the Royal Family imprisoned. Before he can activate his Hypno-Gun, which he believes will make all mankind surrender to his will, the Royal Family escapes and subdues him. Escaping Attilan with his band of renegades in a rocket, Maximus lands in the South American country of Costa Salvador, and attempts to build a will-deadening device similar to his Hypno-Gun. His plans are opposed by the Hulk and the United States Army, however, and he and his allies are forced to flee again.

Maximus later foments a battle between the Royal Family and the Fantastic Four. Returning to Attilan, Maximus is welcomed back by his brother Black Bolt, who prefers Maximus to be somewhere he can be watched. Black Bolt detects that Maximus's psionic powers, suppressed since he was an adolescent, are beginning to return. Offering no explanation, Black Bolt has Maximus placed in a suspended animation capsule, inside which he cannot use his powers. Black Bolt's cousin Gorgon, however, objects to Black Bolt's inhumane treatment of Maximus and frees the latter. Maximus immediately uses his mental powers to subjugate the minds of the Inhuman populace and to give Black Bolt amnesia. Maximus then restores the dark force barrier around Attilan and begins negotiations with the alien Kree to sell certain Inhumans to the Kree to be used as soldiers. Eventually Black Bolt's memory returns, and alongside the Avengers, he returns to Attilan and once again destroys the barrier. The Avengers drive the Kree agent away before he can accomplish his mission and Black Bolt liberates the enslaved Inhumans.

With his mental powers traumatically submerged, Maximus escapes strict punishment for his treachery by feigning insanity. He then begins work on his next project to usurp the throne, the construction of the android Omega, whose power source is supposedly the collective guilt evinced by the Inhuman populace over their treatment of the subhuman Alpha Primitives. The Fantastic Four helps the Royal Family thwart the construct, and the damage it causes was slight. Maximus stages his fourth successful coup a short time later after the Royal Family briefly leaves Attilan on business. Taking Crystal and her husband Quicksilver captive, Maximus forces Black Bolt to give him the crown in order to spare their lives. Black Bolt does so, and allows himself to be placed in captivity. Maximus reestablishes contact with the Kree and negotiates a deal where the Kree would take all of the Inhumans with extraordinary abilities, leaving him the other half of the population to rule. Triton and Karnak rescue most of Maximus's captives and outwit the Kree agent Shatterstar. Unaware of that victory, Black Bolt lets loose with his quasi-sonic scream in agony, once again leveling the city. Angered by what had happened, Black Bolt strikes Maximus for the first time and has him imprisoned.

Maximus then allies himself with the Enclave, a band of human scientists who capture Medusa. The Enclave wants to conquer Attilan and dispatches an aerial strike force. When the Enclave threatens to execute Medusa, however, Maximus turns on them out of unrequited passion for his brother's betrothed. A weapon Maximus is manning overloads, leaving Maximus in a deathlike coma. Black Bolt has his brother's body placed in a special crypt, and when Attilan is transported from the Earth to the Moon, Maximus accompanies it. On the moon, Maximus's mind makes contact with an alien power crystal located there, and it reawakened his dormant mental powers. When Black Bolt next comes to pay his respects to his brother, Maximus is able to use his power to affect a transfer of consciousness between them. For several months Maximus rules Attilan in Black Bolt's body as Black Bolt lay imprisoned. Reestablishing contact with the Enclave, Maximus helps them implement meteoroid launchers with which they intend to bombard Earth. With the aid of the Avengers, Maximus' switch is discovered, and the Enclave's schemes are foiled. Maximus is forced to return to his rightful body and was once again placed in solitary confinement.

His next plot carried out from his prison cell involves the Inhuman Woz, and almost results in Attilan being conquered by Earth forces. It is foiled by Black Bolt and Medusa, who arrange for Attilan to be teleported away before its destruction.

Silent War
During the 2007 miniseries Silent War, Maximus again plots his revenge, taunting Black Bolt from his prison and trying to sway a distressed Medusa on his side. He manages to convince Medusa to try to have Luna help "cure" him, only for Luna to realize too late that the "cure" instead allows Maximus to gain control over all the other Inhumans. After the enhanced Marines managed to destroy Attilan, Maximus usurps the throne of the Inhumans from Black Bolt, taking Medusa as his queen, and announcing a new plan to conquer Earth.

"Secret Invasion"
During the 2008 "Secret Invasion" storyline, Maximus was initially indifferent to the threat of the Skrulls. When it was discovered that Ahura was a Skrull in disguise, however, Maximus defeated it.

"War of Kings"
In the 2009 "War of Kings", storyline Black Bolt has retaken the throne of the Inhumans. Maximus is still free and serves as Black Bolt's science advisor, devising war machines for the Kree to use against their adversaries, the Shi'ar. After Black Bolt's vanishing, during a time when the ruling of the various empires is up for dispute, Maximus is seen under the close supervision of Gorgon. His desires for something, anything to rule, are swiftly dismissed.

"Death of the Inhumans"
In the pages of "Death of the Inhumans," Maximus is at New Arctilan when the Kree begin their campaign to get the Inhumans to join them or die. The Super-Inhuman Vox and the Kree with him are on New Arctilan and began murdering every Inhuman they come across, old or new. Armed with all of the Inhumans’ abilities and no humanity, Vox easily cuts his prey down with his powers or his literal energy scythe. Even Maximus cannot defeat Vox as he quickly losing an arm for even making the attempt. Pretty soon, Lockjaw arrived and stood up with Maximus to attempt to stop Vox on their own but things did not go so well and Vox fired an enormous blast, ripping a hole in both of them. It was later revealed that the Kree took his body and placed it in a Vox costume where he was brainwashed to serve the Kree. When Beta Ray Bill took down Vox during his confrontation with Black Bolt, it broke the brainwashing on Maximus as something on Vox's costume teleported her away while also killing Maximus.

Powers and abilities
Maximus has a genius-level intellect and great inventiveness. His mental powers granted by the mutagenic effects from exposure to Terrigen Mist give him the ability to numb, override, and even wipe out a person's mind. He has the ability to induce short-term amnesia in others, and the ability to exchange his consciousness with another's. Maximus's mental powers have a limited range as well as variability - he can only affect minds in a certain radius and only create one effect at a time. His influence generally functions while Maximus concentrates, but he has left long-buried influence in his subjects as well, which he can trigger by voice command, causing a subject to carry out embedded commands, forget, or remember.

Maximus's mental instability often prevents him from making full use of his powers.

Maximus is superhumanly intelligent.  He is an extraordinarily gifted inventor, with advanced knowledge of physics, mechanics, and biology. He has invented an Atmo-gun (able to create seismic shockwaves and "negative zone" force fields), and a Hypno-gun (able to control minds at a far distance).

Even without using the Terrigen Mist, the Kree modifications, combined with centuries of selective breeding, have given all Inhumans certain advantages. Their average lifespan is 150 years and an Inhuman in good physical condition possesses strength, reaction time, speed, and endurance greater than the finest of human athletes. Inhumans who are in excellent physical shape can lift one ton and are physically slightly superior to the peak of normal human physical achievement. Most Inhumans are used to living in a pollution-free, germ-free environment and have difficulty tolerating air and water pollution for any length of time.

Other versions

"Age of Apocalypse"
In the alternate timeline seen in the 1995–1996 "Age of Apocalypse" storyline, Maximus was a Horseman of Apocalypse, the Horseman of Death. He operates on the Blue Area of the Moon, aboard Ship, Apocalypse's Celestial starship, whose sentient artificial intelligence is known as Ship. Maximus is served by his personal strikeforce formed by clones of the Inhuman Royal Family, which he had murdered himself, altered into monstrous forms by the Terrigen Mists, which Death has offered Apocalypse in exchange for his position. Maximus also experiments on Sunfire, who has been captured by Holocaust after the destruction of Japan, leaving him unable to control his powers. When the X-Men appear on the Moon, believing Apocalypse to be hibernating on Ship, Maximus capture the X-Men and seeks to transform them into his servants, with which he will overthrow Apocalypse. However, Cyclops, who has been sent to ensure the transfer of the Mists, attacks the betrayer Death and liberate the X-Men with the aid of Blink. Maximus dies, alongside his servants, in the destruction of Ship caused by Sunfire, whose powers flare out of control after he was released.

Marvel Knights 2099
In an alternate take on Marvel 2099, called Marvel Knights 2099, the Inhumans are in a space station named Atillan, having left Earth decades ago. Here they await the cryogenic awakening of Black Bolt. The leader of the Council greets Black Bolt and has Lockjaw teleport them to the throne room for privacy. The leader announces that he killed the rest of the Inhumans Royal Family in cryogenic suspension, taking special pleasure in killing Medusa, and took over. The leader reveals himself as Maximus, to Black Bolt's shock and anger, saying that he has used implants to extend his life in order to see Black Bolt vulnerable, at his boiling point. Maximus pleads with Black Bolt to release his power and destroy everything - the station, the legacy, and Maximus himself. Black Bolt finally lets go and in one whisper, destroys everything. The one shot ends with Black Bolt crying and dying in space among the wreckage.

Ultimate Marvel
In the Ultimate Marvel reality, Maximus is introduced in Ultimate Fantastic Four Annual #1 along with the other Inhumans. He is the brother of Black Bolt and the fiancé of Crystal. She refuses to marry him referring to him as a "stunted little peacock" and calling him mad.

In other media

Television
 Maximus appeared in the 1994 Fantastic Four series, voiced by Mark Hamill.
 Maximus appears in the Inhumans motion comic, voiced by Brian Drummond.
 Maximus appears in the Hulk and the Agents of S.M.A.S.H. episode "Inhuman Nature", voiced by Nolan North. In secret, he builds a weapon that will end all humanity, yet would be ineffective against Inhumans. Only Crystal is aware of this weapon upon discovering her plan. For most episodes that the other Inhumans have, combat the Agents of S.M.A.S.H. He is finally discovered and defeated for his betrayal, even though he reactivates the barrier that protects the city Attilan, from the rest of the world, but is ultimately destroyed by Black Bolt.
 Maximus appears in the Ultimate Spider-Man episode "Inhumanity", voiced again by Nolan North. He is behind the mind control of the royal family of Inhumans (when he was betrayed by what happened in Hulk and the Agents of S.M.A.S.H.), he escaped from his cell, seized Attilan and is crowned king, as part of his plan to have the Inhumans in declaring war on S.H.I.E.L.D. dropping Attilan in Manhattan. When trying Máximus on his mind control with Spider-Man, Triton uses the Gyro-Cube to delay Máximus so they can find Black Bolt. Being dug into the palace by Black Bolt, Spider-Man and Triton are confronted by Maximus and the brainwashing in the royal family as Maximus prepares to release Attilan in Manhattan. Máximus also claims that he plans to hunt down all of humanity in order to make Earth an inhuman world. Triton challenges Maximus to a battle with Spider-Man helping to fight Gorgon. As Maximus tries to use his mind control on Triton by claiming that humans are evil, Spider-Man attacks Maximus and destroys the crown, freeing the royal family of Inhumans from their mind control. As Maximus claims that Attilan will still crush Manhattan with humanity, Spider-Man uses his web to Maximus's mouth to shut him up.
 Maximus appears in Guardians of the Galaxy, now voiced by Diedrich Bader. In "Crystal Blue Persuasion", while devising a cure for the Terrigena plague that had caused the Inhumans to grow crystals in their bodies, Maximus was working on mind control technology to control Black Bolt, as part of his plan to pledge allegiance to the Kree. It escaped Drax the Destroyer, Rocket Raccoon and Groot in the thought that he was the ruler of the Inhumans until Star-Lord, Gamora, Medusa, and Lockjaw arrived. Maximus then releases Black Bolt from his ecstasy capsule and has it attacked by the Guardians of the Galaxy alongside the crystallized Alpha Primitives. When Ronan the Accuser arrives in Attilan, Maximus swears allegiance to the Inhumans and the Kree due to the story of having created the Kree Inhumans. Ronan the Accuser goes back on his contract and steals Maximus' mind control helmet by having Black Bolt with him and Star-Lord teleports to the Terrigen Crystals caverns below Attilan. After the Terrigen plague was eliminated and Ronan the Accuser was repelled, Maximus was locked in the Attilan dungeon. In "Inhuman Touch", Star-Lord visits Maximus in his cell to see what he knows about the Cosmic Seed. Máximus tricks Star-Lord into giving him a pencil that allows him to escape from his prison. Maximus first begins by taking control of the Inhumans. Rocket and Groot disable the broadcast. So Maximus uses his Terrigena cannon in a plot to bombard the nearest planet. Star-Lord, Groot, Karnak, and Medusa take it to destroy it from within. When Máximus tries to escape at Milano, Star-Lord and Black Bolt follow him and sneak into Milano. Star-Lord tricks Maximus into hitting the play button on the cassette, claiming that it is a self-destruct button, which plays music that allows Black Bolt to knock Máximus out.
 Maximus appears in the Avengers Assemble episode "Civil War, Part 1: The Fall of Attilan", voiced again by Diedrich Bader. He was seen with some armed shock groups wreaking havoc in Las Vegas, where he was planning to detonate a Terrigen bomb as a weapon only to be defeated by the Avengers and turned over to inhuman guards in New Attilan to be adopted for a New Attilan Processing Center. On his way to being taken to jail, Maximus brainwashed Inferno to wreak havoc on New Attilan, enough to blow up the explosives that Máximus clocked. He managed to escape while creating a force field to contain everyone in the city from exploding. After the Avengers and the royal family of Inhumans evacuate everyone, from New Attilan and Inferno surrendering himself by Truman Marsh's guards, the Hulk had apprehended Maximus, who had left the Inhumans exposed to the human race. As Maximus tries to run, Black Bolt carries it out with his voice speaking, "Brother."

Iwan Rheon portrays Maximus in the live-action Marvel Cinematic Universe (MCU) television series Inhumans, while his child self is portrayed by Aidan Fiske. It is revealed that Maximus' Terrigenesis made him human causing him much envy towards Black Bolt, especially since their father, Agon, has denied Maximus his desire to rule. He stages a coup with the help of Auran and the Inhuman Royal Guards that are on his side while the rest of the Royal Family flee to Hawaii through Lockjaw. Though Lockjaw is stunned by Pulsus and Crystal is placed under house arrest. He attempts to have Crystal support him, but she rebels and flees to Hawaii as well, leaving Maximus to convince the council of the Royal Family's incompetence. He further sends out dangerous Inhumans, such as Mordis, to hunt the Royal Family. Maximus further has the human Dr. Evan Declan working for him so that he can study Black Bolt and hopefully use his DNA to create a new Terrigenesis for him. Maximus learns of Auran's position with Declan, but informs her to not tell him of her association with him. Maximus believes that in order for "his" people to gain freedom they have to earn it, therefore he sends Inhumans to hunt his family. Unbeknownst to him, some of the people of Attilan are plotting against him. He later finds out through genetic council member Tibor and has him and his conspirators killed as an example while asking the prophetic Inhuman Bronaja to pick a side. Maximus is reunited with his family for a parley. However, he cheats his family by taking Declan and forces him to prepare a second Terrigenesis. When he is alerted of his family's next move, he tries to escape, but is captured by Triton. He is brought to Black Bolt and tells him that he installed a failsafe so that if he kills him, Attilan will be destroyed. Maximus refuses to give up the throne or stop the dome over the city from collapsing and learns through Bronaja that he will remain the King of Attilan and that Black Bolt was nowhere in sight. Soon, Auran leaves him as the whole city and the Royal Family, sans Black Bolt, escape to Earth. Maximus reveals to Black Bolt that he indirectly killed his parents when he forged a signature for Black Bolt to get lobotomized. Maximus is knocked out and trapped in Attilan's bunker. As he looks at the well stocked room, Maximus realizes that he is still the king of Attilan and that Black Bolt has in fact left him as its only population as Bronaja predicted.
Maximus appears in the anime series Marvel Future Avengers, voiced by Hiroki Takahashi in Japanese and Michael Sinterniklaas in English.

Video games
 Maximus appears in the Facebook game Marvel: Avengers Alliance. He is introduced in "Special Operations 23: Inhumans".
 Maximus appears as both a boss level and playable character in Lego Marvel Super Heroes 2.
 Maximus is a playable character in Marvel: Future Fight.
 Maximus appears as a boss in Marvel Ultimate Alliance 3: The Black Order, voiced again by Diedrich Bader.

References

External links
 Maximus at Marvel.com
 Maximus at MarvelDirectory.com
 The Inhumans at Don Markstein's Toonopedia. Archived from the original on September 17, 2016.

Characters created by Jack Kirby
Characters created by Stan Lee
Comics characters introduced in 1966
Fictional inventors
Fictional kings
Inhumans
Marvel Comics characters who have mental powers
Marvel Comics supervillains
Marvel Comics telepaths
Marvel Comics television characters